The Krueger-Scott Mansion is located in Newark, Essex County, New Jersey, United States. The mansion was built on the corner of Court and High Street (now Martin Luther King Boulevard) in 1888 and was added to the National Register of Historic Places on November 9, 1972.

History
The 40 room mansion was built in 1888 by Gottfried Krueger (1837–1926), founder of Newark's Gottfried Krueger Brewing Company and owner of several other breweries. The construction cost at the time was $250,000. The mansion was sold to the Valley of Newark Scottish Rite Freemasons in 1926 for $100,000. A 700-seat auditorium was added to the mansion to accommodate for various meetings. The mansion was purchased in 1958 by Louise Scott for $85,000. Scott operated a beauty school out of the first floor of the mansion while keeping the upper levels as her private residence. The mansion was added to the New Jersey Register of Historic Places and the National Register of Historic places in 1972. Scott died in 1982 and ownership of the mansion passed to the city of Newark. In 1991, the New Jersey Historic Trust funded a bond for $625,812 to stabilize the exterior of the building. The city of Newark matched that amount, and over the years devoted more than $4 million to turning the home into a center focusing on the black contribution to Newark's development. The federal government contributed an additional $1.5 million., but after a decade of work, plans to turn the house into an African-American cultural center were frozen by the city's Municipal Council, which refused to allocate any more money for the project.

Construction
The mansion is a three-and-a-half-story, Late Victorian style building with a five-story circular tower. A wrap around porch, steeply pitched roof, asymmetrical facade and arched front entryway are characteristic of the Queen Anne Style. The building is a balloon frame structure with a brick facade. The interior consists of lath and plaster walls with wallpaper covering and wood molding. The flooring is made of hardwood set into patterns.  The pedimented windows are an Italianate influence here.

Conversion to artisan housing and workspaces
In late 2020, the city and the company Makerhoods broke ground on refurbishing the mansion into live/work spaces for local experienced "makers" in the food, beauty, craft and other small-scale artisan industries for $1800 a month by application only.

Gallery

In popular culture
The design of the mansion is featured in the animated series The Venture Bros., as the Fitzcarraldo Mansion.

See also
 National Register of Historic Places listings in Essex County, New Jersey

References

External links

 Short video documentary on the history of the Krueger Mansion part 1
 Short video documentary on the history of the Krueger Mansion part 2
  created by Newark journalist Guy Sterling
 View of Krueger Mansion via Google Street View

Houses on the National Register of Historic Places in New Jersey
Houses completed in 1888
Houses in Essex County, New Jersey
Buildings and structures in Newark, New Jersey
Victorian architecture in New Jersey
National Register of Historic Places in Newark, New Jersey
New Jersey Register of Historic Places
Gilded Age mansions